"Goin' to L.A." is a song recorded by German singer Pietro Lombardi from his second studio album Pietro Style (2011). It was written and produced by DSDS jury member Dieter Bohlen. The song was released on November 11, 2011.

Music video
A music video to accompany the release of "Goin' to L.A." was first released onto YouTube on 29 October 2011 at a total length of three minutes and nine seconds.

Track listing
Digital download
 "Goin' to L.A." - 3:08
 "It's Christmas Time" - 3:00 
 "Goin' to L.A." (Music video) - 3:09

Chart performance

Release history

References

2011 singles
Pietro Lombardi (singer) songs
2011 songs
Songs written by Dieter Bohlen